This article comprises three sortable tables of major mountain peaks of the U.S. State of Washington.

The summit of a mountain or hill may be measured in three principal ways:
The topographic elevation of a summit measures the height of the summit above a geodetic sea level.  The first table below ranks the 100 highest major summits of Washington by elevation.
The topographic prominence of a summit is a measure of how high the summit rises above its surroundings.  The second table below ranks the 50 most prominent summits of Washington.
The topographic isolation (or radius of dominance) of a summit measures how far the summit lies from its nearest point of equal elevation.  The third table below ranks the 25 most isolated major summits of Washington.


Highest major summits

Of the major summits of the State of Washington, Mount Rainier exceeds  elevation, four peaks exceed  elevation, and 97 peaks exceed  elevation.

Most prominent summits

Most isolated major summits

Of the major summits of the State of Washington, Mount Rainier exceeds  of topographic isolation, three peaks exceed , and 16 exceed  of topographic isolation.

Gallery

See also

List of mountain peaks of North America
List of mountain peaks of Greenland
List of mountain peaks of Canada
List of mountain peaks of the Rocky Mountains
List of mountain peaks of the United States
List of mountain peaks of Alaska
List of mountain peaks of Arizona
List of mountain peaks of California
List of mountain peaks of Colorado
List of mountain peaks of Hawaii
List of mountain peaks of Idaho
List of mountain peaks of Montana
List of mountain peaks of Nevada
List of mountain peaks of New Mexico
List of mountain peaks of Oregon
List of mountain peaks of Utah

List of mountains of Washington (state)
List of mountain ranges in Washington (state)
List of mountain peaks of Wyoming
List of mountain peaks of México
List of mountain peaks of Central America
List of mountain peaks of the Caribbean
Washington (state)
Geography of Washington (state)
:Category:Mountains of Washington (state)
commons:Category:Mountains of Washington (state)
Physical geography
Topography
Topographic elevation
Topographic prominence
Topographic isolation

Notes

References

External links
John W. Roper, Washington's 100 highest peaks with 400 ft or more prominence, containing a comparison to the Top 100 Bulger List and links to pictures of every mountain. The lowest summit on that list is #40 Castle Peak.

United States Geological Survey (USGS)
Geographic Names Information System @ USGS
United States National Geodetic Survey (NGS)
Geodetic Glossary @ NGS
NGVD 29 to NAVD 88 online elevation converter @ NGS
Survey Marks and Datasheets @ NGS
Bivouac.com
Peakbagger.com
Peaklist.org
Peakware.com
Summitpost.org

 
Mountain peaks of Washington (state), List of
Lists of mountains of the United States
Lists of mountains by elevation
Lists of mountains by prominence
Lists of mountains by isolation